Joaquin Dominguez (born 12 March 1987), is an Argentine professional rugby union player. He previously played his club rugby for Edinburgh Rugby in the Pro12.

He initially joined the Murrayfield team on a trial basis in September 2013, before putting pen to paper on a contract running until summer 2013, after impressing Head Coach Alan Solomons.

Early years
Dominguez featured in Argentina's under 19 squad that competed in the 2006 World Championship in Dubai, with highlights coming in victories against both England and South Africa.

References

1987 births
Living people
Argentine rugby union players
Edinburgh Rugby players
Rugby union centres